Sternitta suffuscalis is a moth of the family Erebidae first described by Swinhoe in 1886. It is found from central India to the south of Sri Lanka.

The wingspan is 9–11 mm. The forewings are unicolorous dark brownish or blackish grey. The crosslines are black. The hindwing ground colour is light grey and the abdomen is light grey.

Taxonomy
The species was originally described in the family Pyralidae.

References

Micronoctuini
Moths described in 1886